Netcracker Technology Corp.,  a wholly owned subsidiary of NEC Corporation, is a provider of business support system (BSS), operations support systems (OSS) and software-defined networking (SDN) and network functions virtualization (NFV) solutions. The company also offers professional services (including planning and consulting, operations and maintenance, and support), as well as managed services.

Headquartered in Waltham, Massachusetts, Netcracker maintains operations and development facilities across the globe.

History
Netcracker Technology was co-founded in 1993 by Dr. Michael Feinberg, currently Netcracker's Chief Technology Officer and Bonnie Ward, the company's Vice President of Corporate Initiatives. In 2008, after 15 years of independent growth, the company was acquired by NEC Corporation. Netcracker then became a wholly owned subsidiary of NEC.

In 2010, Netcracker initiated a large-scale expansion whereby NEC consolidated its Telecom Operations and Management Solutions (TOMS) software and services business under Netcracker.

In February 2015, NEC and Netcracker launched  a joint business brand.

Acquisitions

In 2002 Netcracker expanded its operations into Moscow, Russia, whereby they acquired Moscow City Telephone Network and integration company AVD. 

2011 - Subex's activation business.

2012 - Convergys Corporation's Information Management (IM) business was acquired The acquisition was completed in May and following the acquisition, the unit was integrated into Netcracker. 

2016 - CoralTree Systems.

Legal Trouble 
In 2015, Netcracker agreed to a $11.4 million settlement to resolve allegations under the False Claims Act that the company has hired individuals without appropriate clearances to work on a Defense Information Systems Agency (DISA) contract.

Products and services
Netcracker's products focus on Business Support Systems (BSS), Operations Support Systems (OSS) and Software-Defined Networking (SDN) and Network Functions Virtualization (NFV) technologies for Communications Service Providers worldwide. 

The Netcracker 12 suite was launched in May 2017. The suite covers seven product domains, including Digital Customer Enablement; Digital Business Enablement; Digital Operations Enablement; Digital & Cloud Infrastructure; Cloud Platform; Advanced Analytics; and Business, Operations & Infrastructure Agility Layers offerings.

The portfolio also covers five services domains, including Business & Operational Consulting; End-to-End Turnkey Delivery; Agile Development & DevOps; Cloud Enablements; and Support & Maintenance, Managed Services & End-to-End Outsourcing services.

Its offerings operate within the realms of operations support systems, business support systems, customer experience management, DevOps, microservices, billing and revenue management, AI, the Internet of Things, big data analytics, software-defined networking, network functions virtualization, and more. The Netcracker 12 suite is specifically designed to help service providers evolve into digital service providers via successful digital transformation.

Netcracker also offers a full suite of Managed Services and Professional Services. The company's Managed Services include Hosted, Client-Hosted, and Build-Operate-Transfer delivery models. Professional Services include System Integration, Consulting, Solution Delivery, Outsourcing, and Operations and Maintenance.

Netcracker's suite includes orchestration capabilities, an SDN Controller, and a range of virtual network functions (VNFs), such as virtualized customer premises equipment (vCPE), virtualized evolved packet core (vEPC), and other value-added VNFs and management offerings.

See also

Software industry in Telangana

References

Telecommunications systems
Software companies based in Massachusetts
Software companies of the United States
NEC acquisitions